is a Japanese professional footballer who plays as a striker for  club Kashima Antlers.

Club career

Kashima Antlers
Suzuki joined the Kashima Antlers youth system at the age of 7 in 2003.

After scoring two goals and leading Kashima Antlers to their first ever AFC Champions League title in 2018, Suzuki was named MVP of the competition.

He was chosen as one of the candidates for 2018 Asian Footballer of the Year.

Sint-Truiden
On 15 July 2019, Suzuki joined Belgian First Division A club Sint-Truiden. Suzuki scored his first goal for his new club on 21 September 2019, opening the scoring in his side's 3–0 victory over Sporting Charleroi.

On 30 November 2019, Suzuki headed in the winning goal as Sint-Truiden upset defending league champions Genk, to move up to 10th in the league table.

Kashima Antlers
On 3 January 2022, his departure from Sint-Truiden was announced. He returned to his former club Kashima Antlers. This marked his 6th season in Japan's top flight league (J1 League), where he played from the start of his career in 2015, until transferring overseas in 2019.

International career
His debut call-up to the Japan national team was on 7 November 2018 for the Kirin Cup, but he was excluded because of suffering an ankle sprain in his club's AFC Champions League match.

Career statistics

Club

Honours

Club
Kashima Antlers
J1 League: 2016
Emperor's Cup: 2016
J.League Cup: 2015
Japanese Super Cup: 2017
AFC Champions League: 2018

Individual
AFC Champions League Best Player: 2018

References

External links

Profile at Kashima Antlers

1996 births
Living people
People from Chōshi
Association football people from Chiba Prefecture
Japanese footballers
Association football forwards
J1 League players
J3 League players
Kashima Antlers players
Sint-Truidense V.V. players
Belgian Pro League players
J.League U-22 Selection players
Japanese expatriate footballers
Expatriate footballers in Belgium
Japanese expatriate sportspeople in Belgium